East Upper Silesia is the easternmost extremity of Silesia, the eastern part of the Upper Silesian region around the city of Katowice. The term is used primarily to denote those areas that became part of the Second Polish Republic on 20 June 1922, as a consequence of the post-World War I Treaty of Versailles. Prior to World War II, the Second Polish Republic administered the area as Autonomous Silesian Voivodeship. East Upper Silesia was also known as Polish (Upper) Silesia, and the German (Upper) Silesia was known as West Upper Silesia.

Upper Silesia Plebiscite

Consequently, to the end of World War I in 1918 various proposals emerged defining the division of Upper Silesia. At the Paris Peace Conference a commission for Polish affairs was created to prepare proposals for Polish borders. In their first two proposals (of 27 March 1919 and of 7 May 1919) most of the future province was ceded, together with the region of Oppeln, to Poland. Yet that was not accepted by the Big Four, and following David Lloyd George's suggestion, the plebiscite was organized. Before it took place on 20 March 1921, two Silesian Insurrections instigated by Polish inhabitants of the area were organized. After the referendum, in which Poland had 41% of the votes, a plan of division was created that divided Upper Silesia. Following this, the Third Silesian Uprising took place. The Inter-Allied Commission on Upper Silesia, headed by the French general Henri Le Rond suggested a new plan for division of the area, which was prepared by an ambassadors commission in Paris on 20 October 1921. The division - which became effective by 20 June 1922 - still created a situation in which some rural territories that voted mostly for Poland were granted to Germany and some urban territories with a German majority were granted to Poland. The Polish Sejm decided that the easternmost Upper Silesian areas should become an autonomous area within Poland organised as the Silesian Voivodeship and with Silesian Parliament as a constituency and Silesian Voivodeship Council as the executive body. The part of Silesia awarded to Poland was by far the best-developed and richest region of the newly formed state, producing most of Poland's industrial output. Consequently, to the division in 1922, the German-Polish Accord on East Silesia (Geneva Convention) was concluded on 15 May 1922 which dealt with the constitutional and legal future of Upper Silesia as it has partly become Polish territory.

Inter-War Silesia

Nazi Germany

East Upper Silesia was annexed by Nazi Germany along with other Polish areas following the invasion of Poland in 1939, which triggered the outbreak of World War II. Until 1941, the region was administered as Regierungsbezirk Kattowitz, the easternmost government region of the Silesia Province. From 1941 to 1945, it was part of the Upper Silesia Province. Under Nazi rule, Upper Silesia included the cities of Beuthen, Gleiwitz, Hindenburg in Oberschlesien, Kattowitz, and Königshütte. It also contained the rural districts (Landkreis) of Bendsburg, Beuthen-Tarnowitz, Bielitz, Kattowitz, Krenau, Ilkenau, Pless, Rybnik, Saybusch, Teschen, and Toszek-Gleiwitz.

In the spring of 1945, the region was occupied by the Red Army after the Silesian Offensives defeated the Wehrmacht there.

Present day
After the war, East Upper Silesia was restored to Poland. Poland also received West Upper Silesia and most of Lower Silesia as part of the Recovered Territories. Today, the region is roughly represented by the Silesian Voivodeship.

See also
Administrative divisions of Nazi Germany
Eastern Front (World War II)
History of Poland (1939–1945)
History of Silesia

Notes

References

Further reading
Landkreis Kattowitz 
Okres Międzywojenny 1918-1945 
Zánik Slezska 1.12.1928 

Former government regions of Germany
History of Katowice
Poland in World War II
Silesian Voivodeship (1920–1939)
Subdivisions of Nazi Germany
World War II occupied territories
Government regions of Prussia